is a Japanese actress and previous member of the 1970s idol group Candies. As the leading member of Candies, Itō was in charge of the solo of most of the trio's hit songs. 
Her real name is Ran Mizutani ( Mizutani Ran) née Itō ( Itō Ran).

Itō was born in Kichijōji, Musashino, Tokyo, Japan. She is married to actor Yutaka Mizutani. Itō won the award for best supporting actress at the 2nd Yokohama Film Festival for Disciples of Hippocrates.

In 2019, Itō released her first solo album My Bouquet. On 15 February 2020, she kicked off her first concert tour My Bouquet & My Dear Candies!, which featured several Candies songs in the set list.

Filmography

Films
 Disciples of Hippocrates (1980)
 Foster Daddy, Tora! (1980)
A Boy Called H (2013)
 When the Curtain of Prayer Descend (2018)

TV
 The Sun Never Sets (2000)
 Dare Yorimo Mama o Ai su (2006)
 Full Swing (2008)
 Gakkō ja Oshierarenai! (2008)
 Miss Sherlock (2018)
 Modern Love Tokyo (2022)

Discography

Albums

Video albums

Singles

See also 
Miki Fujimura (a member of Candies)
Yoshiko Tanaka (a member of Candies)

References

External links
 (Sony Music Entertainment Japan)
Official profile at Trysome

Japanese actresses
Japanese idols
1955 births
Living people
People from Musashino, Tokyo